Malavli Station is a railway station of Pune Suburban Railway on Mumbai–Chennai line.

The station has two platforms and a foot overbridge. Nearby attractions are two famous hilly forts: Lohagad Fort and Visapur Fort. Also nearby are the very famous Ekvira Devi Mandir, Karla Caves and Bhaja Caves.
Vedanta academy of Swami Parthasarathy is about 200 meters north of the station.

Local trains between Pune Junction–, –Lonavala stop here. The only passenger train having a stop at this station is the Pune Junction– Passenger.

References
Malavli Current Timings

Pune Suburban Railway
Pune railway division
Railway stations in Pune district